Shinjirō, Shinjiro or Shinjirou (written: , , , ,  or ) is a masculine Japanese given name. Notable people with the name include:

, Japanese singer and actor
, Japanese actor
, Japanese baseball player
, Japanese politician
, Japanese government official and diplomat
, Japanese professional wrestler

Japanese masculine given names